Kamfinsa is a constituency of the National Assembly of Zambia. It covers part of the south-east of Kitwe in Kitwe District of Copperbelt Province, together with a rural area that includes the town of Mwekera.

List of MPs

References

Constituencies of the National Assembly of Zambia
Constituencies established in 1991
1991 establishments in Zambia